Kurt Martin (13 March 1923 – 1 November 2006) was a Finnish footballer. He was named in Finland's squad for the Group 2 qualification tournament for the 1954 FIFA World Cup. He was also part of Finland's squad for the 1952 Summer Olympics, but he did not play in any matches.

References

External links
 

1923 births
2006 deaths
Finnish footballers
Finland international footballers
Sportspeople from Vaasa
Association football defenders
Vasa IFK players